Variovorax humicola is a Gram-negative, non-spore-forming, rod-shaped and motile bacterium from the genus of Variovorax which has been isolated from forest soil near the Kyonggi University from Suwon in Korea.

References

External links
Type strain of Variovorax humicola at BacDive -  the Bacterial Diversity Metadatabase

Comamonadaceae
Bacteria described in 2016